Edgardo Sebastian Galindez (born 1 December 1982  in San Miguel de Tucumán, Tucumán, Argentina) is an Argentine  footballer. He plays as a defender and his current club is the Atlético Tucumán.

Career  

He began his career in 2001  playing for Atlético Tucumán. He played for the club until 2004. In 2004, he played for  Ferro, where he remained until 2005 . In 2005, he went to Aldosivi, playing there until 2006. In 2006, he played form Talleres de Córdoba. In 2007, he played for San Martín de Tucumán. In 2007, he returned to Talleres de Córdoba, leaving in 2010. In 2010, he played for University Juventud Unida, where he remained until 2011. In 2011, he played for Atlético Tucumán.

References

1982 births
Living people
Argentine footballers
Association football defenders
Sportspeople from San Miguel de Tucumán